Ellis is a masculine given name which may refer to:

 Ellis (Nez Perce) (c. 1810–1848), a Native American leader
 Ellis Chapman (born 2001), English footballer
 Ellis R. Dungan (1909–2001), American film director, best known for his work in Indian, particularly Tamil, films
 Ellis Genge (born 1995), English rugby union player
 Ellis Harrison (born 1994), Welsh footballer
 Ellis Hollins (born 1999), English actor
 Ellis Jenkins (born 1993), Welsh rugby union player
 Ellis Kadoorie (1865–1922), Jewish entrepreneur and philanthropist prominent in Hong Kong
 Ellis Marsalis Jr. (1934–2020), American jazz pianist and educator, patriarch of the musical Marsalis family
 Ellis Rabb (1930–1998), American actor and director
 Ellis Short (born 1960), American businessman, former owner and chairman of English football club Sunderland A.F.C.
 Ellis Simms (born 2001), English footballer
 Ellis Taylor (born 2003), English footballer

English-language masculine given names